Banded darter may refer to:
Banded darter (dragonfly) (Sympetrum pedemontanum), a European species of dragonfly of the family Libellulidae
Banded darter (fish) (Etheostoma zonale), a small freshwater fish in the family Percidae found it the eastern United States

Animal common name disambiguation pages